Edward Durell Stone (March 9, 1902 – August 6, 1978) was an American architect known for the formal, highly decorative buildings he designed in the 1950s and 1960s. His works include the Museum of Modern Art, in New York City, the Museo de Arte de Ponce in Ponce, Puerto Rico, the United States Embassy in New Delhi, India, The Keller Center at the University of Chicago, and the John F. Kennedy Center for the Performing Arts in Washington, D.C.

Life and work
Stone was born and raised in Fayetteville, Arkansas. He attended the University of Arkansas, where he joined Sigma Nu Fraternity, Harvard and M.I.T., but did not earn a degree. In 1927 he won the Rotch Travelling Scholarship, which afforded him the opportunity to travel through Europe on a two-year stipend. Stone was impressed by the new architecture he observed in Europe, buildings designed in what would come to be known as the International Style. He returned to the United States in 1929 and took up residence in Manhattan. Hired by the architectural firm of Schultze and Weaver, he designed interiors for the new Waldorf-Astoria Hotel. He subsequently worked for the Associated Architects of Rockefeller Center and became the principal designer of Radio City Music Hall.

Stone was an early advocate of the International Style. His first independent commission was the Richard H. Mandel House, in Mount Kisco, New York (1933). This was followed by the Ulrich Kowalski house, also in Mt. Kisco (1934), and the Albert C. Koch house in Cambridge, Massachusetts (1936). In 1936 Stone was chosen as associate architect for the new Museum of Modern Art in New York City, designed in collaboration with Philip L. Goodwin. Stone also designed a private residence for MoMA president Anson Conger Goodyear, the A. Conger Goodyear House, in Old Westbury, NY (1938). Both the Richard H. Mandel House and A. Conger Goodyear House are listed on the National Register of Historic Places.

At the outset of World War II Stone enlisted in the U.S. Army. He was promoted to the rank of major and served as chief of the Army Air Force Planning and Design Section. Returning to New York after the war, Stone was commissioned to design the ten-story El Panama Hotel in Panama City, Panama (1946), the University of Arkansas Fine Arts Center in Fayetteville (1948), and the 850-bed Hospital del Seguro Social del Empleado in Lima, Peru (1950).

Stone’s best-known work was the Embassy of the United States in New Delhi, India (1959). Tasked with creating a modern building that respected the architectural heritage of its host country, he designed a temple-like pavilion on a raised podium. Frank Lloyd Wright called the embassy one of the most beautiful buildings he had ever seen, and it won a first honor award from the American Institute of Architects (AIA). Subsequent commissions such as the Stanford University Medical Center in Palo Alto, California (1955), the Stuart Pharmaceutical Company in Pasadena, California (1956), and the United States pavilion at the 1958 Brussels World’s Fair (1957), repeated elements originally designed for the embassy. The Stuart building and World’s Fair pavilion both won awards from the AIA, and Stone was elected to the Institute’s College of Fellows in 1958.

Described as romanticist, Stone’s ornate designs brought him commercial success. By the 1960s his firm was among the largest architectural practices in the United States, with over 200 employees and offices on both coasts. Buildings from this period include the North Carolina State Legislative Building in Raleigh (1960), the Pakistan Institute of Nuclear Science and Technology in Nilore (1961), the National Geographic Society building in Washington, D.C. (1961), the Museo de Arte in Ponce, Puerto Rico (1961), the uptown campus of the University at Albany (1962), the John F. Kennedy Center for the Performing Arts in Washington, D.C. (1962), the General Motors Building in New York City (1964), the PepsiCo World Headquarters, in Purchase, New York (1967), the Florida State Capital complex in Tallahassee (1970), and the Standard Oil building (now known as the Aon Center) in Chicago, Illinois (1970).

Stone also was the architect of the former Windham College in Putney, Vermont. Windham closed in 1978 and its abandoned campus was taken over by the present-day Landmark College in 1985.

Stone retired in 1974 and died in 1978. Following a New York City funeral his ashes were buried in his hometown of Fayetteville.

Honors and awards

Honorary degrees
Doctor of Fine Arts, University of Arkansas, 1951
Doctor of Fine Arts, Colby College, 1959
Master of Fine Arts, Otis Art Institute of Los Angeles County, 1961
Doctor of Fine Arts, Hamilton College, 1962

Memberships and honors
Medal of Honor, New York Chapter of the American Institute of Architects, 1955
American Institute of Architects, Fellow, 1958
National Institute of Arts & Letters, Member, 1958
National Urban League, Trustee, 1958
American Academy of Arts & Sciences, Fellow, 1960
American Federation of Arts, Trustee, 1960
National Institute of Social Sciences, Gold Medal, 1961
Building Stone Institute, Architect of the Year, 1964
Horatio Alger Award, 1971

Architectural awards
Silver Medal, Architectural League of New York, 1937 – Guest House for Henry R. Luce, Mepkin Plantation, Moncks Corner, South Carolina
Silver Medal, Architectural League of New York, 1950 – A. Conger Goodyear Residence, Old Westbury, New York
Gold Medal, Architectural League of New York, 1950 – Museum of Modern Art, New York City, New York (Philip Goodwin, Associate)
Gold Medal, Architectural League of New York, 1950 – El Panama Hotel, Panama City, Panama 
First Honor Award, American Institute of Architects, 1958 – Stuart Pharmaceutical Co., Pasadena, California
Award of Merit, American Institute of Architects, 1958 – U.S. Pavilion, Brussels, Belgium
First Honor Award, American Institute of Architects, 1961 – U.S. Embassy, New Delhi, India
Award of Merit, American Institute of Architects, 1963 – Community Hospital of the Monterey Peninsula, Carmel, California
Honor Award, American Institute of Architects, 1967 – Ponce Museum of Art, Ponce, Puerto Rico

Selected works

Radio City Music Hall and the Center Theater, in Rockefeller Center, New York City (as senior designer in the employ of the Rockefeller Center Associated Architects with Donald Deskey and Eugene Schoen, interior designers, 1932)
Richard H. Mandel House, Bedford Hills, New York (with Donald Deskey, interior designer, 1933)
Mepkin Plantation for Mr. and Mrs. Henry R. Luce, (now known as Mepkin Abbey), Monck's Corner, South Carolina (1936)
Museum of Modern Art, New York City, (Philip L. Goodwin, associate architect, 1937)
A. Conger Goodyear House, Old Westbury, New York (1938)
Ingersoll Steel, Utility Unit House, Kalamazoo, Michigan (1946)
El Panama Hotel, Panama City, Panama (Mendez and Sanders, associated architects, 1946)
Fine Arts Center, University of Arkansas, Fayetteville, Arkansas (Haralson & Mott, associated architects, 1948)
United States Embassy, New Delhi, India (1954)
Phoenicia InterContinental Hotel first phase, Beirut, Lebanon (Elias and Dagher, associated architects, 1954. Second phase by Joseph Philippe Karam, then altered 1997)
Stanford Medical Center, Palo Alto, California (1955)
Bruno & Josephine Graf Residence, Dallas, Texas (1956)
Main Library and Mitchell Park Branch Library, Palo Alto, California (1956, Mitchell Park Branch demolished 2010)
Edward Durell Stone Townhouse, 130 East 64th Street, New York City (1956)
Stuart Pharmaceutical Co., Pasadena, California (1956, partially demolished)
U.S. Pavilion at Expo 58, Brussels, Belgium (1957, partially demolished)
First Unitarian Society Church, Schenectady, New York (1958)
Gallery of Modern Art, including the Huntington Hartford Collection (now known as Museum of Arts & Design), New York City (1958, substantially altered 2006)
International Trade Mart (now known as Four Seasons Hotel and Private Residences New Orleans), New Orleans, Louisiana (Robert Hall, associate architect, 1959)
Robert M. Hughes Memorial Library, Norfolk, Virginia (1959, substantially altered 2011)
Harvey Mudd College, Claremont, California (1959)
North Carolina State Legislative Building, Raleigh, North Carolina (Holloway-Reeves & Associates, associated architects, 1960)
Beckman Auditorium, California Institute of Technology, Pasadena, California (1960)
National Geographic Society Museum, Washington, D.C. (1961)
Museo de Arte, Ponce, Puerto Rico (1961)
Windham College (now known as Landmark College), Putney, Vermont (1961)
State University of New York at Albany, Albany, New York (1962)
John F. Kennedy Center for the Performing Arts, Washington, D.C. (1962)
Prince George's Center (now known as University Town Center), Hyattsville, Maryland (1962)
Busch Memorial Stadium, St. Louis, Missouri (1962, demolished 2005)
WAPDA House, Lahore, Pakistan (1962)
Stuhr Museum of the Prairie Pioneer, Grand Island, Nebraska (1963)
Claremont School of Theology, Claremont, California (1963)
 P.S. 199 School, Lincoln Square/Upper West Side, New York (1963)
Davenport Public Library, Davenport, Iowa (1964)
General Motors Building, New York City (Emory Roth and Sons, associated architects, 1964)
Ethel Percy Andrus Gerontology Center, University of Southern California, Los Angeles, California (1964)
Tulsa Convention Center, Tulsa, Oklahoma (Murray, Jones and Murray, associated architects, 1964, expanded and renamed to Cox Business Center)
Von KleinSmid Center, University of Southern California, Los Angeles, California (1964)
Garden State Arts Center (now known as PNC Bank Arts Center), Holmdel, New Jersey (1965)
Pakistan Institute of Nuclear Science and Technology, (1965)
Georgetown University Law Center Bernard P. McDonough Hall, Washington, D.C. (1966)
Westgate Tower, Austin, Texas (1966)
Brith Emeth Temple, Pepper Pike, Ohio (1967)
Fort Worth City Hall, Fort Worth, Texas (1967)
Kirwan-Blanding Complex, University of Kentucky, Lexington, Kentucky (1967; demolished 2020)
PepsiCo World Headquarters Complex, Purchase, New York (1967)
Jefferson County Civic Center, Pine Bluff, Arkansas (1968)
Worcester Science Museum (now known as the EcoTarium), Worcester, Massachusetts, (1964, altered 1998)
Aiwan-e-Sadr (1970), Islamabad 
Wilshire Colonnade, Los Angeles, California (1970) 
Eisenhower Medical Center, Rancho Mirage, California (1971)
W.E.B. Du Bois Library, University of Massachusetts Amherst, Amherst, Massachusetts (1971)
Amarillo Museum of Art, Amarillo, Texas (1972)
Standard Oil Building (now known as Aon Center), Chicago, Illinois (Perkins & Will, associated architects, 1972)
Buffalo News Building, Buffalo, New York (1973) 
Scripps Green Hospital, La Jolla, California (1974)
First Bank Building (now known as First Canadian Place), Toronto, Ontario (1975)
Babin Kuk Resort, Dubrovnik, Croatia (1976)
Florida State Capitol, Tallahassee, Florida (Reynolds, Smith & Hills, associated architects, 1977)
University of Alabama School of Law, Tuscaloosa, Alabama (1977)
Scripps Anderson Outpatient Pavilion, La Jolla, California (by Edward Durell Stone Associates, 1983)
Government Center Station, Miami, Florida (1984)
Scripps Research Institute, La Jolla, California (by Edward Durell Stone Associates, 1985)
Museum of Anthropology, Xalapa, Veracruz, Mexico (by Edward Durell Stone Associates, 1986)

Gallery

Footnotes

Notes

Citations

Works cited

General references
 Everett, Derek R. "Modern Statehouses for Modern States: Edward Durell Stone's Capitol Architecture in North Carolina and Florida." Southern Historian, Vol. 28 (Spring 2007): pp. 74–91.
 Head, Jeffrey. "Unearthing Stone." Metropolis magazine, Urban Journal, January 2008.
 Heyer, Paul. Architects on Architecture: New Directions in America. (New York: Walker & Co., 1966): pp. 172–183.
 Hunting, Mary Anne. "Edward Durell Stone, Perception and Criticism." (PhD diss., Graduate Center, City University of New York, 2007).
 Hunting, Mary Anne. “Edward Durell Stone.” In Oxford Bibliographies in Architecture, Planning, and Preservation. New York: Oxford University Press, forthcoming.
 Hunting, Mary Anne. "From Craft to Industry: Furniture designed by Edward Durell Stone for Senator Fulbright." The Magazine Antiques (May 2004): 110–121.
 Hunting, Mary Anne. “Legacy of Stone: As Campus Buildings Rise and Fall, A Leading Mid-20th-Century Architect’s Vision Endures,” Vanderbilt Magazine (Summer 2014): *18–19, 78–79.
 Hunting, Mary Anne. "The Richard H. Mandel House in Bedford Hills, New York." Living with Antiques.The Magazine Antiques (July 2001): 72–83.
 Hunting, Mary Anne. "Rediscovering the Work of Edward Durell Stone". Modern Magazine (Spring 2013): 70 and 72.
 Ricciotti, Dominic. "Edward Durell Stone and the International Style in America: Houses of the 1930s." American Art Journal, Vol. 20, No. 3 (Summer 1988): pp. 48–73.
 Ricciotti, Dominic. "The 1939 Building of the Museum of Modern Art: The Goodwin-Stone Collaboration." American Art Journal, Vol. 17, No. 3 (Summer 1985): pp. 51–76.

External links

The Edward Durell Stone web site, a resource for current information on the life and work of Edward Durell Stone
Finding Aid for the Edward Durell Stone Papers at The University of Arkansas, David W. Mullins Library, Department of Special Collections
Finding Aid for the James Hicks Stone Papers at The University of Arkansas, David W. Mullins Library, Department of Special Collections
The Edward Durell Stone entry in The Encyclopedia of Arkansas History & Culture by Robert L. Skolmen
An Edward Durell Stone biography established and maintained by the State University of New York at Albany
Photographs of the Bruno and Josephine Graf house in Dallas, Texas
Ethel Goodstein-Murphree, "In Memoriam: Edward Durell Stone's Carlson Terrace, 1957-2007"

Two views on 2 Columbus Circle
"Goodbye, 2 Columbus Circle" by Witold Rybczynski
"She Doesn't Want to Be Helped" by Walt Lockley

1902 births
1978 deaths
People from Fayetteville, Arkansas
Architects from Arkansas
 
Modernist architects from the United States
Postmodern architects
Harvard Graduate School of Design alumni
Massachusetts Institute of Technology alumni
University of Arkansas alumni
Boston Architectural College alumni
20th-century American architects
Fellows of the American Institute of Architects